The Music of Styx – Live with Symphony Orchestra is a double CD recording of Dennis DeYoung's live performance of his work both as a solo artist and with the band Styx. The performance was recorded live on April 4, 2003 at the Chicago Theatre in Chicago, Illinois.  As indicated by the album title, the songs are symphonically arranged and performed with a live orchestra. Three new studio tracks, "Hello God", "My God (Can Beat Up Your God)", and "Goodnight My Love", appear on the album.

Mike Eldred, who played the part of Quasimodo in DeYoung's musical The Hunchback of Notre Dame is featured as a guest vocalist on the two tracks from DeYoung's score for the musical.

A live DVD of the concert was released at the same time of the album, with a reduced track listing.

Track listing
All songs written by Dennis DeYoung, except as noted:

CD 1
 "The Grand Illusion" - 5:34
 "Lady" - 4:43
 Contains interpolation of Boléro, written by Maurice Ravel
 "Eine Kleine Nachtmusik" (Mozart) / Lorelei (Dennis DeYoung, James Young) - 4:40
 "Light Up" - 4:52
 "Intro" - 1:57
 "Babe" - 4:24
 "Intro" - 0:53
 "Show Me the Way" - 2:58
 "Ave Maria" - 5:17
 "Castle Walls" - 6:24
 "Intro" - 0:38
 "Claire De Lune" (Debussy) - 1:51
 "Don't Let It End" - 5:00
 "Hello God" - 4:49

CD 2
 "Mr. Roboto" - 5:23
 "Rockin' the Paradise" (Dennis DeYoung, Tommy Shaw, James Young) - 4:12
 "Intro" - 1:00
 "Black Wall" - 6:38
 "Desert Moon" - 6:56
 "With Every Heartbeat" - 5:40
 "Suite Madame Blue" - 7:52
 "The Best of Times - 7:41
 "Intro" - 1:40
 "Come Sail Away" - 8:06
 "My God (Can Beat Up Your God)" - 4:52
 "Goodnight My Love" - 4:31

DVD track listing
 "Intro"
 "Light Up"
 "The Grand Illusion"
 "Lady"
 "The Best of Times"
 "Ave Maria"
 "With Every Heartbeat"
 "Mr. Roboto"
 "Don't Let It End" 
 "Lorelei"
 "Babe"
 "Come Sail Away"
 "Show Me the Way"
 "Suite Madame Blue"

Personnel
Dennis DeYoung: vocals, keyboards, piano
Mike Eldred: vocals on "Ave Maria" and "With Every Heartbeat"
Dawn Marie Feusi: vocals on "With Every Heartbeat"
Tom Dziallo: guitars
Hank Horton: bass guitar, vocals
Rick Snyder: keyboards, vocals
Kyle Woodring: drums, percussion
Suzanne DeYoung: backing vocals
Chicago Children's Choir: backing vocals

References

Dennis DeYoung albums
2004 live albums
2004 video albums
Live video albums